New York's 46th State Senate district is one of 63 districts in the New York State Senate. It has been represented by Democrat Michelle Hinchey since 2021, succeeding Republican George A. Amedore Jr.

District 46 is the newest district in the legislature, having been drawn from pieces of existing Senate districts in 2012, increasing the size of the body from 62 seats to 63.

Geography
District 46 is located in the Hudson Valley and western Capital District, including all of Montgomery County and Greene County and parts of Albany, Schenectady, and Ulster Counties.

The district overlaps with New York's 19th and 20th congressional districts, and with the 102nd, 103rd, 104th, 109th, 111th, and 112nd districts of the New York State Assembly.

Recent election results

2020

2018

2016

2014

2012

Federal results in District 46

References

46